Vasilios Mantzis (born 4 December 1991) is a Greek professional footballer who plays as a striker for Super League club Ionikos.

Honours
Volos
Gamma Ethniki: 2017–18
Football League: 2018–19

References

1991 births
Living people
Greek footballers
Greek expatriate footballers
Expatriate footballers in Cyprus
Greek expatriate sportspeople in Cyprus
Super League Greece players
Football League (Greece) players
Gamma Ethniki players
Cypriot First Division players
PGS Kissamikos players
Volos N.F.C. players
Olympiakos Nicosia players
Ionikos F.C. players
Association football forwards
People from East Attica
Footballers from Attica